Broderick Washington Jr. (born December 4, 1996) is an American football nose tackle for the Baltimore Ravens of the National Football League (NFL). He played college football at Texas Tech.

College career
Despite playing on the offensive line at Longview High School, Texas Tech offered Washington as a defensive lineman. He started three seasons, was a team captain his junior and senior seasons, and participated in the 2020 Senior Bowl and NFLPA Collegiate Bowl.

Professional career

Baltimore Ravens
Washington was selected in the fifth round (170th overall) of the 2020 NFL Draft by the Baltimore Ravens. The Ravens received the 170th pick used to select Washington as a result from a trade that sent Kaare Vedvik to the Minnesota Vikings. Washington signed his rookie contract on May 5, 2020. He was placed on the reserve/COVID-19 list by the team on November 28, 2020, and activated two days later.

Personal
Washington was arrested and charged with six counts of destruction of property on March 14, 2021, after police said he broke into five cars and damaged an apartment building in Arlington, Texas.

References

External links
Texas Tech bio

Living people
People from Longview, Texas
Players of American football from Texas
American football defensive tackles
Texas Tech Red Raiders football players
Baltimore Ravens players
1996 births